Lyne Viaduct is a viaduct at Lyne in the Scottish Borders of Scotland. It consists of three stone skew arches and a plate girder approach span over a minor road and was built to carry the Symington to Peebles branch line of the Caledonian Railway over Lyne Water to the west of Peebles. Now closed to rail traffic the bridge is used as a footpath.

History
The Symington, Biggar and Broughton Railway's extension to Peebles was authorised on 3 July 1860 but by the time construction was complete in 1863 the company had been absorbed by the much larger Caledonian Railway. The bridge is smaller but of similar design to the nearby Neidpath Viaduct and it often confused with it. From the slender piers pilasters extend to parapet level and the parapet is capped by cast-iron railings. On 1 January 1923 ownership of the viaduct, along with the rest of the Caledonian Railway, passed to the London, Midland and Scottish Railway and thence to the Scottish region of British Railways on nationalisation in 1948. The line lost its regular passenger traffic on 5 June 1950 and closed completely on 7 June 1954 but the bridge remains in use as a footpath.

See also
Lyne
Lyne Kirk
Lyne railway station
Lyne Water
List of places in the Scottish Borders
List of places in East Lothian

References

Railway bridges in Scotland
Pedestrian bridges in Scotland
Skew bridges
Transport in the Scottish Borders
Bridges in the Scottish Borders
Bridges completed in 1863
Viaducts in Scotland
Stone arch bridges
1863 establishments in Scotland